Karin Bäckstrand is professor of political science at Stockholm University, Sweden, who has written extensively on climate and environmental governance and advises the ICSU Earth System Governance project.  She is a member of the Swedish Climate Policy Council in Sweden.

References

External links
 At Earth System Governance

Swedish political scientists
Year of birth missing (living people)
Living people
Academic staff of Stockholm University